Dougong  is a structural element of interlocking wooden brackets, one of the most important in traditional Chinese architecture.

The use of dougong first appeared in buildings of the late centuries BC and evolved into a structural network that joined pillars and columns to the frame of the roof. Dougong was widely used by the ancient Chinese during the Spring and Autumn period (770–476 BC) and developed into a complex set of interlocking parts by its peak in the Tang and Song periods. The pieces are fitted together by joinery alone without glue or fasteners, requiring precise carpentry.

After the Song dynasty, brackets and bracket sets used in palatial structures and important religious buildings became more ornamental than structural, no longer fitting the description of traditional dougong.

Function

Dougong is part of the network of wooden supports essential to the timber-frame structure of traditional Chinese building. Because the walls in these structures are not load-bearing (curtain walls), they are sometimes made of latticework, mud or other delicate material. Walls functioned to delineate spaces in the structure rather than to support weight.

Multiple interlocking bracket sets are formed by placing a large wooden block (dou) on a column to provide a solid base for the bow-shaped brackets (gong) that support the beam or another gong above it. The function of dougong is to provide increased support for the horizontal beams that span the vertical columns, or pillars, by transferring the weight over a larger area of a beam into each column. This process can be repeated many times, and rise many stories. Adding multiple sets of interlocking brackets or dougong  reduces the amount of strain on the horizontal beams where they  transfer their weight onto a column. Multiple dougong also create elasticity and allow structures to withstand damage from earthquakes.

During the Tang and Song dynasties, dougong was mainly used as a building structure to support the weight of the roof without too much decorative effect.

During the Ming dynasty, innovation brought about the invention of new wooden components that aided  dougong in supporting the roof. This allowed dougong to add a decorative element to buildings, exemplifying the traditional Chinese integration of artistry and function. Bracket sets became smaller and more numerous, and brackets could be hung under eaves, giving the appearance of graceful baskets of flowers while continuing to support the roof.

The Bao'en Temple in Sichuan is a good example of the Ming style. It has forty-eight types and 2,200 sets of dougong  to support and ornament it. It is a well-preserved fifteenth century monastery complex located in northwestern Sichuan province, China. It was built by Wang Xi, a local chieftain, between 1440 and 1446 during Emperor Yingzong's reign (1427–64) in the Ming dynasty (1368–1644).

See also
Tokyō

References

Additional sources 
Liang Ssu Ch'eng Chinese Architecture, A Pictorial History

External links

Dougong Brackets (斗拱 Dougong)
Arts of China to A.D. 900 (excerpt about dougong)
PBS Nova: Secrets of the Forbidden City
Chinese architecture

Architectural elements
Architecture in China
Chinese architectural history
Japanese architectural styles
Shinto architecture
Chinese inventions
Timber framing
Wooden buildings and structures